The All-Canadian Congress of Labour (ACCL) was a Canadian national labour confederation, which existed from 1926 to 1940.

It was founded in 1926 as a rival to the Trades and Labour Congress. It was headed by Aaron Mosher. It included remnants of the One Big Union and had over 40,000 members. The ACCL was opposed to American interference in the Canadian labour movement. In 1929, the communist unions left the ACCL and formed the Workers' Unity League. In 1940, the ACCL merged with Canadian sections of the Congress of Industrial Organizations to form the Canadian Congress of Labour.

References
All-Canadian Congress of Labour in The Canadian Encyclopedia.

Defunct trade unions in Canada
Trade unions established in 1926
Trade unions disestablished in 1940
National trade union centres of Canada
1926 establishments in Canada
1940 disestablishments in Canada